Song Jiayuan (born 15 September 1997) is a Chinese athlete specialising in the shot put. She represented her country at the 2019 World Championships in Doha without reaching the final. In 2016, she won a silver medal at the World U20 Championships in Bydgoszcz.

Her personal bests in the event are 18.32 metres outdoors (Chengdu 2019) and 18.23 metres indoors (Hangzhou 2019).

International competitions

References

1997 births
Living people
Chinese female shot putters
World Athletics Championships athletes for China
Competitors at the 2019 Summer Universiade
Athletes (track and field) at the 2020 Summer Olympics
Olympic athletes of China
21st-century Chinese women